Rekord Irkutsk or DYuSSh Rekord is a bandy club from Irkutsk, Russia. It was founded in 1986. The club colours are black and blue.

Rekord Irkutsk won the Bandy World Cup Women in 2012.

References

Bandy clubs in Russia
Bandy clubs in the Soviet Union
Sport in Irkutsk
Bandy clubs established in 1986
1986 establishments in Russia